Robert Lebi is a Canadian contract bridge player.  He competed for Team Canada at the 1993 Maccabiah Games in Israel.

Bridge accomplishments

Wins
 
 North American Bridge Championships (4)
 Blue Ribbon Pairs (1) 1989 
 Fast Open Pairs (1) 2006 
 Silodor Open Pairs (1) 2008  
 Wernher Open Pairs (1) 2012

Runners-up
 
 North American Bridge Championships (2)
 Reisinger (1) 1982 
 Fast Open Pairs 2015 (1)

Notes

Year of birth missing (living people)
Living people
Canadian contract bridge players